Chetopa Creek is a stream in Wilson County, Kansas and Neosho County, Kansas, in the United States.

The Osage Indians made settlement near Chetopa Creek. Chetopa was the name of an Osage chief.

See also
List of rivers of Kansas

References

Rivers of Neosho County, Kansas
Rivers of Wilson County, Kansas
Rivers of Kansas